Scopula tenuisocius is a moth of the family Geometridae. It is found in Japan, the Russian Far East, and the Kuril Islands. It was described by Hiroshi Inoue in 1942.

The wingspan of this species is 22–26 mm.

References

Moths described in 1942
tenuisocius
Moths of Japan
Moths of Asia